Dagr is the personification of day in Norse mythology.

Dagr may also refer to:

 Defense Advanced GPS Receiver, a handheld device
 Direct Attack Guided Rocket, a weapons system
 "Dagr", a song by Wardruna from the 2009 album Runaljod – Gap Var Ginnunga
 Dragon Alliance of Gamers and Role-Players, the group that founded Dragon Con

See also
 Dagger (disambiguation)
 Dagur (disambiguation)